Arghavan Salles (born February 23, 1980) is an Iranian American bariatric surgeon. Salles is the Special Advisor for DEI Programs in the Department of Medicine at Stanford University School of Medicine and a Senior Research Scholar at the Clayman Institute for Gender Research. Salles’ research focuses on gender equity, well-being, and the challenges women face in the workplace. Salles works as an advocate for equity and inclusion and as an activist against sexual harassment. Salles is an international speaker who supported health professionals during the COVID-19 pandemic through social media.

Early life and education 
Salles was born in Iran. In 1985, when she was five years old, she emigrated to the United States with her mother. She became a U.S. citizen when she was 21. While in high school Salles loved math.

In 2002, Salles received a B.S. in Biomedical Engineering and a B.A. in French from the University of Southern California. In 2006, Salles received an M.D. from Stanford University School of Medicine. Salles did a residency in general surgery from Stanford University School of Medicine from 2006 to 2015. In 2014, Salles completed a PhD social psychology from Stanford University, after which she finished her last two years of surgical residency, going on to become a Board Certified Surgeon in 2016. After finishing her residency and PhD in 2016, Salles then completed a year long fellowship training in minimally invasive surgery at Washington University School of Medicine in St. Louis.

Career
While Chief Resident of General Surgery at Stanford, a graduate of the surgery program took his life just 6 months after graduating. Salles has said that this event dramatically impacted and motivated Salles and her peers to enact changes and educate the community about burnout, depression, and wellbeing in medicine. In 2011, Salles and a professor of surgery at Stanford at the time, Dr. Ralph Greco, created the "Balance in Life" program for surgery residents. This program included weekly psychotherapy session, mentor-mentee pairing between senior and junior residents, and support for residents in their search to find their own doctors and dentists for medical needs. Greco and Salles created one of the most innovative and progressive resident surgery wellness program in the country at the time, underscoring the need for programs like these to be in place. The Accreditation Council for Graduate Medical Education (ACGME) has since tried to model a nationwide wellness program after the Balance in Life program Salles helped start at Stanford.

In addition to issues of mental health burden due to burnout, Salles also began to see glaring evidence of inequities, bias, and gender harassment in medicine, specifically in surgery.  These observations made her question the meritocratic society she once thought existed in her field. These experiences pushed her to take a break from her residency to pursue a PhD in education.

From September 2016 to June 2019, at the same time she was completing a fellowship at Washington University School of Medicine, Sallas was an assistant professor in the Department of Surgery at Washington University, where her lab conducted research on gender bias and inequities in medicine.

As part of that teaching, in 2017 Salles developed an online wellness resource for Washington University residents that offered counselling, crisis lines, and information on how to cope with adverse life events. Her efforts were featured in the Surgery Annual Report for 2017.

In 2018, Salles became a founding member of Time's Up Healthcare, part of the Time's Up initiative which supports “safe, fair, and dignified” work for women around the world and helps to prevent sexual assault and gender based discrimination in the workplace. This same year, in 2018, Salles, along with 5 other female medical trainees at Washington University, helped start 500 Women in Medicine, a satellite of 500 Women Scientists. 500 Women in Medicine works to make medicine more inclusive and reflect the true diversity of society in order to best address the healthcare needs of the population.

Salles completed her fellowship in 2019, becoming a Board Certified Physician of Obesity Medicine, and was recruited back to Stanford to hold a position in the Educational Programs and Services at the medical school. As a Scholar in Residence, Salles is specializes in Medical Education Research. Salles’ research now focuses on the representation of women at surgical conferences, implicit and explicit gender bias in healthcare and in performance evaluations, as well as how to maintain the health and wellbeing of physicians and medical trainees. Since Salles is also a trained bariatric surgeon, she also advocates against weight bias highlighting its negative impact on the lives of individuals suffering from obesity.

During the COVID-19 pandemic, Salles has been a voice of support and comfort to healthcare professions through Twitter. She says that fitness, in this case through yoga, help people to regain a sense of control in the uncertainty of COVID-19, and as such she has created fitness challenges, free weekly yoga classes, and daily videos on Twitter and Instagram to engage her followers and bring together a supportive community.

Research

Stereotype threat 
It was during her PhD that Salles learned for the first time about stereotype threat. This not only shaped her thesis work but directed her career path as well.  Salles began to realize the ways in which stereotype threat might be affecting her and her female peers in their evaluations during her surgery residency. Interested in exploring gender bias in surgery, Salles' dissertation research focused on the negative stereotypes about women in surgery and how those affect women training to become surgeons.

Due to strongly ingrained gender biases in society, both patients and medical peers hold strong misconceptions that women are not as competent surgeons as men. This is exemplified by the old "surgeon riddle" which unveils strong gender stereotypes in medicine such that the majority of the population much more easily associate surgeons with being male than being female. These stereotypes that society holds, about women being less competent surgeons than men, leads to a phenomenon called stereotype threat which Salles explored in her work. Salles hypothesized that stereotype threat, the fear of affirming a negative stereotype about ones' group, causes women increased stress and leads to decreased performance in surgical residency. Salles tested this hypothesis by implementing methods to combat stress and stereotype threat through value affirmations.

Salles saw increases in the performance of female surgeons who had done value affirmation exercises compared to those who had not, suggesting that low cost interventions targeted towards social-psychological well-being can improve female residents’ performance. Salles later also showed that women surgeons who have higher stereotype perception have worse psychological health. Fascinatingly, this correlation was only significant for female surgeons and not male surgeons or non-surgeons, further confirming the existence of stereotype threat in female surgeons and the importance of addressing the negative psychological impacts women face in order to level the playing field.

Gender bias in surgery 
Continuing her research on gender bias at Washington University, Salles and her colleagues explored gender bias in clinical evaluations of surgical residents. Their results, published in The American Journal of Surgery in 2018, showed that evaluations display gendered differences and the overall tones of men's evaluations were more positive and included more standout words than women's. These findings highlight the severe impact of biases on the potential for career success in surgery.

Interested in the extent to which gender bias exists in surgery, Salles and her colleagues used the Implicit Association Test (IAT) to assess implicit biases in the medical field. They found that respondents associated men with career and surgery while they associated women with family and family medicine. These results are a critical step since they bring about awareness of the gender bias that exists in medicine, even in 2018, and this awareness will hopefully lead to conscious efforts as well as interventions to improve the current medical climate and bring it towards equality.

One way that Salles and her students have discovered to address inequities in medicine, is creating networks for women physicians and trainees as well as increasing their visibility. Highlighting the achievements of women in medicine and ensuring a supportive community of fellow female physicians is exactly what Salles and her colleagues strived to do by creating 500 Women in Medicine in 2018. This community has since grown and exists as a support for women and platform for effecting positive change.

Well-being in surgery 
Salles also explores different facets of how well-being impacts retention of residents in the progression towards careers in surgery. In 2018, Salles found that feelings of social belonging were positively correlated with well-being and negatively correlated with thoughts of leaving surgery. She then explored how general self-efficacy impacted retention in surgical specialties and found that self-efficacy was a strong predictor of well-being, which prevents physician burnout and improves retention in the medical field.

Awards and honors
 2018: Joan F. Giambalvo Fund for the Advancement of Women - Grant to study gender bias in medicine
 2019: Women in Medicine Summit, #IStandWithHer Award Honorable Mention
 2019: American Medical Women's Association, Exceptional Mentor Award
 2019: Society of Asian American Surgeons, Visiting Professor
 2020: ABIM Top Research Article Award on Medical Professionalism Estimating Implicit and Explicit Gender Bias Among Health Care Professionals and Surgeons

Membership
 2011–present: American Educational Research Association, member
 2017–present; Association for Academic Surgery, Publications Committee, Member
 2017–present: SAGES, WE R SAGES Task Force, member
 2018–present: 500 Women in Medicine, co-founder; advisor (2018-2019)
 2018–present: American College of Surgeons, fellow
 2018–present: American Society for Metabolic and Bariatric Surgery, co-chair Communications Committee
 2018–present: Association for Surgical Education, chair Surgical Education Research Group
 2018–present: Surgery for Obesity and Related Diseases, Creative Director and Associate Editor
 2018–present: TIME'S UP Healthcare, Founding Member
 2019–present: Association for Surgical Education, vice chair Awards Committee
 2019–present: Western Surgical Association, Member

Selected works and publications

Selected work

Selected publications

References

Further reading

External links
 Arghavan Salles at Stanford University School of Medicine

Living people
American women physicians
Bariatrics
Stanford University School of Medicine faculty
University of Southern California alumni
American people of Iranian descent
1980 births
Washington University in St. Louis fellows
Washington University School of Medicine faculty